Rosemarie Taupadel (born 25 February 1952) is a German speed skater. She competed in three events at the 1972 Winter Olympics.

References

External links
 

1952 births
Living people
German female speed skaters
Olympic speed skaters of East Germany
Speed skaters at the 1972 Winter Olympics
Speed skaters from Berlin